Heroes in Blue is a 1927 American silent drama film directed by Duke Worne and starring John Bowers, Sally Rand and Gareth Hughes.

The film focuses on two rival families, the Kellys and the Dugans. Bob Kelly is a policeman like his father, while Anne Dugan's brother is a criminal who commits arson as a cover for robberies.

Cast
 John Bowers as Bob Kelly
 Sally Rand as Anne Dugan
 Gareth Hughes as Tom Dugan
 George Bunny as Mr. Dugan
 Barney Gilmore as Pat Kelly
 Ann Brody		
 Lydia Yeamans Titus

References

Bibliography
 Munden, Kenneth White. The American Film Institute Catalog of Motion Pictures Produced in the United States, Part 1. University of California Press, 1997.

External links
 

1927 films
1927 drama films
1920s English-language films
American silent feature films
Silent American drama films
Films directed by Duke Worne
Rayart Pictures films
1920s American films